Denver Union Station is the main railway station and central transportation hub in Denver, Colorado. It is located at 17th and Wynkoop Streets in the present-day LoDo district and includes the historic station house, a modern open-air train shed, a 22-gate underground bus station, and light rail station. A station was first opened on the site on June 1, 1881, but burned down in 1894. The current structure was erected in two stages, with an enlarged central portion completed in 1914.

In 2012, the station underwent a major renovation transforming it into the centerpiece of a new transit-oriented mixed-use development built on the site's former railyards. The historic station house reopened in the summer of 2014, hosting the 112-room Crawford Hotel, restaurants and retailers.

History

19th century: Original structures

Denver's first train station was constructed in 1868 to serve the new Denver Pacific Railway, which connected Denver to the main transcontinental line at Cheyenne, Wyoming. By 1875, there were four different railroad stations, making passenger transfers between different railroad lines inconvenient. To remedy this issue, the Union Pacific Railroad proposed creating one central "Union Station" to combine the various operations. In February 1880, the owners of the four lines (the Union Pacific, the Denver & Rio Grande, the Denver, South Park & Pacific and the Colorado Central) agreed to build a station at 17th and Wynkoop Streets. Architect A. Taylor of Kansas City was hired to develop the plans and the station opened in May 1881.

A fire that started in the women's restroom in 1894 destroyed the central portion of the 1881 depot. The Kansas City architectural firm of Van Brunt & Howe was hired to design a larger replacement depot in the Romanesque Revival style. Both the 1881 and 1894 depots included a tall central clock tower with four clock faces.

Early 20th century
On July 4, 1906, a large arch was dedicated in front of the station in order to provide a symbolic threshold for travelers entering and leaving the city. Constructed at a cost of $22,500 with 70 tons of steel and over 2,000 light bulbs, the arch originally featured the word "Welcome" on both sides. The elevation facing 17th Street was changed to "Mizpah", a Hebrew word expressing an emotional bond between separated people, and used as a farewell to people leaving Denver.

In 1912, the original Union Depot partnership was dissolved and replaced by the Denver Terminal Railway Company, representing the then-major operators of the station (the Atchison, Topeka and Santa Fe, the Chicago, Burlington and Quincy, the Chicago, Rock Island and Pacific, the Colorado & Southern, the Union Pacific and the Denver & Rio Grande Western railways). The new partnership decided to demolish and rebuild the central portion of the station to handle the increasing passenger traffic. The new central portion, designed by Denver architects Gove & Walsh, was built in the Beaux-Arts style and opened in 1914.

By the 1920s and 1930s, over 80 trains served the station daily with notable dignitaries such as Queen Marie of Romania, Presidents Theodore Roosevelt, William Howard Taft and Franklin Delano Roosevelt arriving to Denver through the station. As a result of growing passenger service, the Mizpah Arch in front of the station was deemed a traffic hazard and was torn down in 1931.

Late 20th century: Decline

Although World War II saw a surge in rail traffic, the latter half of the 20th century saw a sharp decline in service for Union Station and countless other train stations in the United States as competition began to grow from automobiles and airlines.

For the first time in 1958, passenger traffic at Stapleton International Airport exceeded that of Union Station. It was during this period that the orange "Union Station: Travel by Train" signs were placed on both sides of the building to advertise intercity rail travel.

Amtrak eventually became the sole provider of rail service through the station, operating only two trains daily between Chicago and the Bay Area with the California Zephyr. From the 1980s to the early 2000s, RTD, the City and County of Denver, the original site owner Denver Union Terminal Railway Corporation, and several other entities made periodic improvements such as accommodating an RTD bus lane to access Market Street Station from I-25 and a light rail connection.

The station also served special trains such as the Denver & Rio Grande Western Railroad's Ski Train, which operated until the end of the winter of 2008–2009; in September 2009, plans were announced to revive the service as a special limited route beginning in December, but this fell through due to insurance problems.

Until the grand renovation, the station served the annual Cheyenne Frontier Days Train, which runs between Denver and Cheyenne, Wyoming for the Frontier Days Rodeo event. The popular excursion train was later relocated to a site near the Denver Coliseum, where it continued to operate until being discontinued in 2019.

21st century: Renovations

Redevelopment

In 2001, RTD purchased Union Station and the surrounding site of its old rail yards from the Denver Union Terminal Railway Corporation under a jointly-funded agreement between RTD, the City and County of Denver, the Colorado Department of Transportation, and the Denver Regional Council of Governments, known as the Partner Agencies. A master plan was developed in 2002 that envisioned both the building and surrounding 19.5 acre (79,000 m2) site be redeveloped as the hub of a multi-modal transportation network with transit-oriented private development. The plan was approved in 2004 by the Partner Agencies and was backed by voters in November of that year as part of the FasTracks program.

After a competition in 2006, the Partner Agencies selected the private Union Station Neighborhood Company as the master developer of the entire site. Its plan called for the transit elements connected to Union Station in the master plan to be constructed in one single phase at an estimated cost of $500 million. In 2008, Hargreaves Associates and Skidmore, Owings & Merrill were selected to design the public spaces including the landscape, train hall, bus terminal, and light rail station. The project received a $300 million grant from the United States Department of Transportation on July 30, 2010 to help fund construction of three light-rail tracks and eight heavy-rail tracks for both Amtrak and commuter rail services, as well as additional storage and servicing capabilities.

As construction at the site commenced in 2010, Amtrak's passenger station and boarding platform were moved on February 1, 2011 to a temporary site at 21st and Wewatta streets, behind Coors Field. The new light rail station was the first component of the project to open on August 15, 2011, two blocks west of the former light rail stations and adjacent to the consolidated main line railroad tracks near the Denver Millennium Bridge. The westernmost stop of the 16th Street MallRide shuttle, was also moved west adjacent to the new light rail stop.

Amtrak trains started serving the new open air train hall on February 28, 2014, while the new underground 22-gate Bus Concourse opened on May 11, 2014. The new bus concourse replaced Market Street Station at 16th St. & Market St., which closed permanently after thirty years of use as a hub for RTD buses. Bustang served Union Station Bus Concourse since its launch in 2015. In 2020, Greyhound Lines moved their Denver station from a terminal on 19th Street to the Union Station Bus Concourse. Other intercity bus lines at the Bus Concourse are Burlington Trailways and Express Arrow.

Commuter rail service at the new train hall began in April 2016 with the opening of the A Line, offering a long-awaited connection to Denver International Airport, running every 15 minutes during peak hours with a travel time of approximately 37 minutes. Service between Denver and Westminster began in July 2016 on the first segment of the B Line, which runs every 30 minutes during peak hours. The travel time between the two stations is approximately 11 minutes. Service to Wheat Ridge on the G Line began in April 2019, with an end-to-end travel time of 27 minutes. Service to Thornton on the N Line started in September 2020, with an end-to-end runtime of 29 minutes.

Restoration of the historic station house 

Simultaneous with the construction of its surrounding site, the historic station house also underwent a complete renovation. In 2011, a competition between the Denver Union Station Neighborhood Company and the Union Station Alliance (consisting of local firms Urban Neighborhoods Inc., Sage Hospitality, Larimer Associates, REGen, llc. and McWhinney) created different proposals for the future use of the structure. Both plans called for maintaining a waiting area for transit and spaces for Amtrak, the creation of retail spaces, and integrating the interior spaces with the public plazas facing the station. However, the Denver Union Station Neighborhood plan also envisioned a public market and commercial office space while the Union Station Alliance called for the integration of an independent hotel with an emphasis on creating the Great Hall as "Denver's Living Room".

By 2012, RTD selected the proposal from the Union Station Alliance to renovate the structure as a hotel at a cost of $54 million with retail, public, and transit facilities and approved a 99-year lease for its redevelopment.

The main historic building closed to the public on December 1, 2012, for construction and re-opened July 26, 2014. The majority of the terminal building's upper levels have now become the 112-room Crawford Hotel, with the  Great Hall on the ground level serving as the hotel lobby, public space, and train waiting room and an additional  of the ground level serving as 10 independent retail and restaurant spaces.

Future

A stop at Union Station has been included in most proposals for Front Range Passenger Rail, an under-development inter-city rail service that would connect Pueblo, Colorado Springs, Denver, Boulder, Fort Collins, and Cheyenne. Alternate proposals would have the service bypass Union Station and downtown Denver, instead stopping at Denver Airport station.

Architecture

Layout

As an inter-modal transportation hub, Denver Union Station consists of the historic terminal building and, on the site's former rail yards, an open-air train hall, a 22-gate underground bus terminal, and a light rail station. The train hall stands immediately behind the historic building and houses tracks for Amtrak and the commuter rail lines. An entrance between the train hall and the historic building lead directly to the underground bus terminal, which stretches west for two city blocks along 17th Street until it terminates at an above-ground light rail station. Street-level pavilions at the light rail stop/Chestnut Place, Wewatta Street and at each platform in the train hall provide additional vertical circulation to the bus terminal.

Each of these transportation elements are tied together above ground by major public spaces and landscape elements such as the 17 St. Promenade/Gardens, Wynkoop Plaza and several other public plazas.

Historically, a subterranean passage accessed through the northern wing building connected the station to the old rail platforms above. However, the passage and its entrance was demolished with the construction of the bus terminal.

Historic building

The present-day Union Station building consists mainly of two lower wing buildings flanking a larger central mass built during different parts of the station's history. The wing buildings were built with the first 1881 structure in a Romanesque Revival style, featuring tall, narrow windows, rusticated stonework and motifs of Colorado's state flower, the columbine. When the station was gutted by the 1894 fire, the facades of the wing buildings were incorporated into the 1894 depot and the 1914 renovation. They originally functioned as offices and other facilities for the station through its history, although today the structures house guestrooms for the Crawford Hotel and several restaurants.

When originally constructed, the Great Hall also included three large chandeliers and ten long wooden benches that incorporated heating and lighting into their framework. While the renovation saw the return of similar chandeliers as the originals, it also saw the removal of the benches due to asbestos.
Other modifications made during 2012 included changing the brown and tan color scheme of the interior to a more neutral white. The old ticket counters and offices were also converted into the Terminal Bar along with several retail and restaurant spaces being created on the periphery of and opening on to the Great Hall. In general, the 2012 renovation sought to create "Denver's Living Room" in the Great Hall by diversifying its functions. It functions today as part hotel lobby, part Amtrak, part waiting area, part retail, and part public space.

References

External links

 
 Union Station | RTD - Denver

 The Crawford Hotel at Denver Union Station
 Denver Union Station Project Authority
 Denver Union Station (USA RailGuide – TrainWeb)

Union stations in the United States
Transit centers in the United States
Transit-oriented developments in the United States
Amtrak stations in Colorado
Bus stations in Colorado
RTD light rail stations in Denver
Economy of Denver
Transportation buildings and structures in Denver
Denver
Denver
Denver
Former Chicago, Rock Island and Pacific Railroad stations
Former Union Pacific Railroad stations
National Register of Historic Places in Denver
Railway stations on the National Register of Historic Places in Colorado
Railway stations in the United States opened in 1894
Clock towers in Colorado
Skidmore, Owings & Merrill buildings
W Line (RTD)
Union Pacific Railroad stations in Colorado
1894 establishments in Colorado
Former Union Pacific Railroad stations in Colorado
RTD commuter rail stations in Denver